Paul Kyser (born December 6, 1943) is an American promoter, record label owner, singer, songwriter, record producer and arranger. Along with Leon Stuckey he co-wrote "Just How Sweet Is Your Love" for Rhyze, which appears on the Boogie's Gonna Getcha: '80s New York Boogie compilation album. He co-wrote  "Be My #2"  which appears on the R. Kelly Untitled album. He is also credited with discovering the group Jimmy Briscoe & The Little Beavers.

Background
Kyser is responsible for singer Retta Young meeting her future husband Al Goodman, who would be notable for his involvement with the groups Moments, and Ray, Goodman & Brown.

Writing and production
According to the May 8, 1971 issue of Billboard, one of Kyser's and Vetri's recent projects at the time was a production for Colossus Records with the group Devotion.

He wrote and produced the song "Invitation To The World" for Jimmy Briscoe & The Little Beavers which was released in 1977. It was one of two disco singles that Billboard recommended in its October 8 edition that year. In 1979, he produced "Into The Milky Way" for the same group. He co-wrote the song with Leon Stuckey.

Work with Leon Stuckey
Leon Stuckey was credited co-composer on many recordings that Kyser wrote and produced. Their co-compositions included, "Oh What A Pity" and "Comin' On Strong". They co wrote "Ain't Nothing New Under The Sun" and "True Love (Is Worth More Than Gold)" for Jimmy Briscoe And The Beavers. Both songs appeared as B sides for singles released on the Wanderick label. They also co-wrote both sides of the Breeze single, "Just In The Nick Of Time" bw "Everybody Loves Music". As a sole composer, Stuckey's work includes "If I Could Have You" bw "Anybody Else But You" for The J.C.B.

Labels
In the early 1970s he founded the Silver Dollar Records label with Tom Vetri as his vice-president. The first act to have a release on the label was Nu-Sound Express with "Ain't It Good Enough" bw "I've Been Trying". The label would eventually become defunct but came back to life with its reformation in 1980 by Kyser & Vetri, with its new location at 1650 Broadway, New York City 10019.

He set up the New Jersey-based Pi Kappa which released singles from 1973 to 1976 by Jimmy Briscoe and The Little Beavers, Calender, Storm and the Super Disco Band.

He set up the Wanderick label as a subsidiary of TK Records. This was used to release recordings by Jimmy Briscoe And The Beavers. It operated from 1977 until 1978.

References

External links
 Paul Kyser at Soul Sauce

Paul Kyser also Produced and wrote That's The Way It's Got To Be(Body And Soul) By the Soul Generation on his label Ebony Sounds Records. Paul Kyser Also Produced Terry Tates song Babies Having Babies also Eleanor's song Sneak Preview of Trumpet records.</ref></ref>

Living people
American record producers
American male songwriters
African-American songwriters
21st-century African-American people
1943 births
20th-century African-American people